Juan Diego Nieva Guzmán (born 13 February 1999) is a Colombian footballer who currently plays as a midfielder for América de Cali.

Career statistics

Club

Notes

References

1999 births
Living people
Colombian footballers
Colombian expatriate footballers
Association football midfielders
Categoría Primera A players
América de Cali footballers
HNK Šibenik players
Colombian expatriate sportspeople in Croatia
Expatriate footballers in Croatia
Footballers from Cali